Petr Pithart's Cabinet was in power from 29 June 1990 to 2 July 1992. It was the first Czech government formed after democratic election. It originally consisted of Civic Forum (OF), Christian and Democratic Union (KDU-ČSL), Christian Democratic Party (KDS) and Movement for Autonomous Democracy–Party for Moravia and Silesia (HSD-SMS). Civic Forum was dissolved in 1991 and replaced by Civic Movement (OH) and Civic Democratic Party (ODS).

Government ministers

References

Czech government cabinets
Civic Forum
Civic Democratic Party (Czech Republic)
Civic Democratic Alliance
KDU-ČSL
Civic Movement
Coalition governments of the Czech Republic